Andy Larkin may refer to:
 Andy Larkin, protagonist on the Canadian TV show What's with Andy?
 Andy Larkin (baseball) (born 1974), Major League Baseball player
 Andy Larkin (rower) (born 1946), American rower